El Eco Obrero ('The Workers Echo') was a workers publication published from Sucre, Bolivia. The publication was founded in 1887, and was the organ of the Workers Mutual Aid Society of the Capital. José Santos Sea was the director of El Eco Obrero.

References

Publications established in 1887
Spanish-language newspapers
Newspapers published in Bolivia